György Keleti (18 May 1946 – 13 September 2020) was a Hungarian politician, who served as Minister of Defence between 1994 and 1998.

Personal life
He had been married since 1973. His wife was Erzsébet Petrik. They had three daughters, Andrea, Györgyi and Katalin.

György Keleti died on 13 September 2020 after a long illness, at the age of 74.

References

Biography

1946 births
2020 deaths
People from Lučenec
Hungarians in Slovakia
Defence ministers of Hungary
Hungarian Socialist Party politicians
Members of the National Assembly of Hungary (1990–1994)
Members of the National Assembly of Hungary (1994–1998)
Members of the National Assembly of Hungary (1998–2002)
Members of the National Assembly of Hungary (2002–2006)
Members of the National Assembly of Hungary (2006–2010)